The 2003 Tour du Haut Var was the 35th edition of the Tour du Haut Var cycle race and was held on 22 February 2003. The race started and finished in Draguignan. The race was won by Sylvain Chavanel.

General classification

References

2003
2003 in road cycling
2003 in French sport
February 2003 sports events in France